Tytthoscincus temmincki is a species of skink. It is endemic to Indonesia.

References

temmincki
Endemic fauna of Indonesia
Reptiles of Indonesia
Reptiles described in 1839
Taxa named by André Marie Constant Duméril
Taxa named by Gabriel Bibron